State Route 160 (abbreviated SR 160) is part of Maine's system of numbered state highways, located in the southwestern part of the state. It is a north–south highway running  from an intersection with State Route 5 in Limerick to an intersection with State Route 117 in Denmark.

Route description
Heading out of town almost due north, the highway roughly parallels SR 5 for its southernmost . SR 160 nicks the northwestern corner of Cornish, then crosses into Parsonsfield and turns to the northwest, crossing through the eastern and northern sections of town.

SR 160 splits from SR 25 and turns back to the north, running along the town border between Porter and Hiram. The highway crosses between the western edge of Hiram and northeastern corner of Porter twice before entering Brownfield. SR 160 continues northwest until reaching Main Street, where it abruptly turns northeast towards the town center and crosses SR 5 / SR 113. SR 160 crosses the Saco River before turning due east and crossing into Denmark. The highway continues east as West Main Street into downtown, where it ends at an intersection with SR 117.

Between Limerick and Brownfield, SR 160 is the westernmost north-south highway in the state.

History
In 1937-8, the SR 160 designation was applied to a new routing through Parsonsfield southward to the current terminus in downtown Limerick. SR 160 was co-routed along SR 25 in Porter to connect the two segments, adding  to the route's overall length.

The first highway in Maine designated SR 160 was located in the extreme northern part of the state and ran between Saint Francis and Madawaska in 1925. Following the designation of U.S. Highways in 1926, the eastern end of the route was truncated to Fort Kent, with part of it becoming the northernmost stretch of US 1. The remainder of the route was originally decommissioned, but is now part of SR 161.

Major intersections

See also

References

160
Transportation in York County, Maine
Transportation in Oxford County, Maine
U.S. Route 1